To retrofit is to add new technology or features to older systems.

Retrofit may also refer to:

 Retrofit (album), a 2010 album by Section 25
 Retrofit, a 2004 album by Daryl Stuermer
 Retrofit (company), a weight loss company
 Retrofit Films, a production company